Omar Eissa (born 18 September 1996) is an Egyptian swimmer. He competed in the men's 50 metre butterfly event at the 2017 World Aquatics Championships. He won two silver medals at the 2015 African Games in the 50 metre and 100 metre butterfly events.

References

1996 births
Living people
Egyptian male swimmers
Place of birth missing (living people)
Male butterfly swimmers
Swimmers at the 2015 African Games
African Games silver medalists for Egypt
African Games medalists in swimming